The 2013 Ladies Tour of Qatar is the 5th edition of the Ladies Tour of Qatar. It is organised by the Qatar Cycling Federation with technical and sports-related assistance from Amaury Sport Organisation (A.S.O.) under the regulations of the Union Cycliste Internationale (category 2.1). It took place from Tuesday 29 January until Friday 1 February 2013 and consisted of 4 stages, one more stage than the former editions. 15 teams of 6 riders took part.

All stages of the 2013 Ladies Tour of Qatar were live broadcast on TV station Al Jazeera.

Teams
Fifteen teams competed in the 2013 Ladies Tour of Qatar. These included eleven UCI teams and four national teams. 
The teams participating in the race were:

UCI teams
Be Pink 
China Chongming-Giant 
Hitec Products UCK 
MCipollini–Giordana 
Orica–AIS 
Rabobank–Liv Giant 
Team Argos–Shimano 
 
Team Tibco–To The Top 
Topsport Vlaanderen–Bioracer 
Wiggle–Honda 
National teams
France 
Germany 
Italy 
Netherlands 

Source

Stages

Stage 1
29 January 2013 – Museum of Islamic to Mesaieed, 
The 88 riders of the 5th edition of the Ladies Tour of Qatar took off this in front of the Museum of Islamic Arts in Doha. Facing the wind, the pack remained bunched during the first half of the stage. The packed bunch covered 36.8 kilometres in the first hour. As the wind started blowing sideways on the pack, several riders failed to keep up with the pace. At km 55, twenty young ladies powered away while former World champion Giorgia Bronzini was left stranded behind. At km 65 the front group could enjoy a 27" lead. The gap started growing as the kilometres went by: 55" on the Bronzini group and 1’45" on the main pack at km 70, and then 2’ with 15 kilometres to go. At km 85, three riders managed to break away: Chloe Hosking, Gracie Elvin and Lisa Brennauer. They were soon to be caught by Liesbet De Vocht. The four escapees managed to stay put all the way to the finish line in Masaieed. Used to battling it out in bunched sprints, Hosking powered to her first stage success in Qatar, outsprinting Elvin and Brennauer to the line. The Aussie captures the overall lead and the first Golden jersey of this edition. With three stages to go, Hosking has a 6" lead over Elvin and also leads the points and best young rider standings that she had won last year.

Stage 2
30 January 2013 – Camel Race Track to Al Khor Corniche, 
The 88 riders took off in windy conditions from the Camel Race Track just outside Doha. After just 6.5 kilometres, China's Jiang broke away and was rapidly caught by two other eager riders: Jasinska and Cordon. While the pack had to deal with a strong head wind, the gap increased from 2 minutes at km 20 to a maximum 8’ 50" at the first intermediate sprint (km 38.5) won by Jiang. As the wind started blowing sideways on the race, nine riders powered away from the pack at km 39 including event leader Chloe Hosking, as well as former winners of the race Ellen van Dijk and Kirsten Wild. At km 46, the leading three could still enjoy a 4’ 40" advantage on the golden jersey group and 5’ 15" over a bunch including Giorgia Bronzini, Rochelle Gilmore and Lisa Brennauer. The second bonus sprint (km 60) was again claimed by Jiang while the favourites’ group moved closer, 1’ 30" adrift. The escapees were eventually caught at km 63. Twelve competitors continued powering to the finish, enjoying a 1’ lead with 20 kilometres to go. After Cordon and Jiang dropped out of the front group, nine ladies could start considering the stage win. One after the other, the five Orica–AIS girls tried to break away but were caught on each attack. It came down to a sprint, captured by Wild, ahead of Trixi Worrack and Ellen van Dijk. Chloe Hosking captured a fine fourth spot on the line, keeping command of the overall standings. The Australian however remains under the pressure of Elvin, 6" adrift and Wild, only 9" behind. Hosking also leads the points and best young rider standings.

Stage 3
31 January 2013 – Al Thakhira to Madinat ash Shamal,  
The 86 riders remaining in the race took off from the Al Thakhira harbour. It would be another day across the peninsula under the influence of strong winds. Despite several attempts, the pack remained bunched all the way to Al Zubara, north-west of Qatar. The first hour had an average speed of 48 kilometres per hour. The first bonus sprint was won by Kirsten Wild As the pack headed up north and the wind started blowing sideways, several riders failed to keep up with the pace. While a crash occurred in the peloton, a group of 18 ladies pulled away including race leader Chloe Hosking, Ellen van Dijk, Wild, Gracie Elvin, and Trixi Worrack. The front group enjoyed a 40" lead at km 83 on a group of 22 including Cromwell, Gilmour and Bronzini. With 25 kilometres to go, as the riders entered the final circuit, the first two groups bunched up together again. 8 riders gave it a go but where rapidly caught before reaching Madinat Al Shamal for the second bonus sprint won by Lisa Brennauer ahead of Chantal Blaak, who had both broken away just before crossing the line. Wild powered to third spot ahead of the pack, 5" adrift. With 10 kilometres to go, Brennauer and Blaak could still enjoy a 10" lead. Both were first caught by Fahlin and Cantele and then by the whole golden jersey group with 5 kilometres to go. Just under 40 riders moved closer to the finish line. With under 3 kilometres to go, race leader Hosking suffered a puncture. Despite being eventually given the winner's time, she could no longer hope for stage victory and extra bonus seconds. Well helped out by her Team Argos–Shimano teammates, Wild powered to a second consecutive stage win, beating Ellen van Dijk and Giorgia Bronzini.

The Dutch lady claimed her fifth victory in Qatar and took command of the overall standings, with a 3" lead over Gilmour and 16" over Elvin, while she also leads the points’ standings. Hosking remains best young rider of the event and will carry the White Pearl jersey during the 4th stage.

Stage 4
1 February 2013 – Sealine Beach Resort to Doha Corniche, 
The 80 riders remaining in the race took off at 1:07 PM to the Doha Corniche where they would have to cover five laps of the traditional final circuit. Facing the wind, the pack remained bunched until the first intermediate sprint in Al Wakra (km 38.5) won by Kirsten Wild ahead of Chloe Hosking and Ellen van Dijk. Just after the sprint, nine ladies managed to break away: MacLean, Rowney, Small, Guderzo, Brand, Longo Borghini, Valsecchi, Cordon, Olds and Glaesser. Their lead grew to 1’10" at km 55 before dropping down once on the final circuit. The second bonus sprint at the 2nd crossing of the line (km 62.5) was claimed by Glaesser ahead of Cordon and Olds, while the pack remained 48" adrift. The front riders were eventually all caught with just over two laps to go. The pack remained bunched all the way to the finish where a sprint was to take place.

Like on the two previous stages, Wild powered to victory, outsprinting Lucinda Brand and Marta Tagliaferro. The Dutch rider captured her sixth success on Qatar soil and comforted her overall lead. Wild indeed wins the Ladies Tour of Qatar for the third time after 2009 and 2010 and shows that she really is the Queen of the event. In the final overall standings, she can enjoy a lead of 14" on Chloe Hosking and 29" on Ellen van Dijk.
 
Added to her Golden Jersey, Wild also wins the points classification's Silver Jersey while, like last year, Hosking finishes best young rider.

Classification leadership

Final classifications

Final General Classification

Points Classification

Youth Classification

Team Classification

References

External links

See also
2013 in women's road cycling

Tour of Qatar
Tour of Qatar
Ladies Tour of Qatar